Eleanor Mary Campbell, Duchess of Argyll DStJ (née Cadbury; 26 January 1973) is a British noblewoman, and Prior of the Order of St John's Priory of Scotland. A member of the Cadbury family, she is the wife of Torquhil Campbell, 13th Duke of Argyll.

Biography
Eleanor Mary Cadbury was born on 26 January 1973 in the London Borough of Merton to Peter Hugh George Cadbury (born 8 June 1943) and wife (1969) Sally Strouvelle. Through her father, she is a great-great-granddaughter of George Cadbury, and a great-great-great-granddaughter of John Cadbury the founder of the Cadbury chocolate company. She has a younger brother, Simon Charles (born 1975).

On 8 June 2002, she married Torquhil Campbell, 13th Duke of Argyll at St. Mary's Church, in Fairford, Gloucestershire.

The Duke and Duchess have three children:
 Archibald Friedrich Campbell, Marquess of Lorne (born London, 9 March 2004), known as Archie Lorne; he served as a Page of Honour to the Queen from 2015 to 2018.
 Lord Rory James Campbell (born London, 3 February 2006)
 Lady Charlotte Mary Campbell (born London, 29 October 2008)

Campbell is currently Prior of the Order of St John's Priory of Scotland. Appointed on 24 June 2021, Campbell is the Priory's first woman Prior.

Campbell is a patroness of the Royal Caledonian Ball, president of the Georgian Group, patroness of Richmond's Hope, First Aid 4 Gambia, a board member of the Historic Houses Association, and founder of Best of the West music festival.

Honours 
  2021: Dame of Justice Venerable Order of Saint John (DStJ)

References

 "Burke's Peerage and Baronetage"

Living people
1973 births
Cadbury
Argyll
People from the London Borough of Merton
Peerage of Scotland
Eleanor
Dames of Justice of the Order of St John